Château de Jaurias is a château in Gout-Rossignol, Dordogne, Nouvelle-Aquitaine, France.

Châteaux in Dordogne